Ray Bradbury is a collection of science fiction short stories by Ray Bradbury edited by Anthony Adams and published by Harrap in 1975.

Contents
 Introduction, by Anthony Adams
 "The Veldt"
 "Let’s Play 'Poison'"
 "All Summer in a Day"
 "Fever Dream"
 "Zero Hour"
 "The Fog Horn"
 "A Sound of Thunder"
 "The Wind"
 "The Scythe"
 "Marionettes, Inc."
 "The Other Foot"
 "The Pedestrian"
 "The Trolley"
 "The Smile"
 "The Gift"
 "The Last Night of the World"
 For Discussion, essay  by Anthony Adams
 Ray Bradbury—His Work, essay  by Anthony Adams
 Further Reading, essay  by Anthony Adams

References

External links 
 
 

1975 short story collections
Short story collections by Ray Bradbury